The 2017–18 Ranji Trophy was the 84th season of the Ranji Trophy, the first-class cricket tournament in India. It was contested by 28 teams divided into four groups, each containing seven teams. The top two teams from Group C progressed to the quarterfinals of the competition.

Ahead of the fifth round of fixtures, Tamil Nadu's last two home games were moved from Chennai following heavy rain and were rescheduled to take place in Indore and Vadodara. In November 2017, Mumbai's fifth-round fixture against Baroda was their 500th match in the Ranji Trophy. Mumbai progressed to the knockout stage of the competition after beating Tripura by 10 wickets in round 7 of the tournament. They were joined by Madhya Pradesh, who topped the group, after beating Odisha by 7 wickets in their final game.

Teams
The following teams were placed in Group C, based on their average points in the previous three years:

 Andhra Pradesh
 Baroda
 Madhya Pradesh
 Mumbai
 Odisha
 Tamil Nadu
 Tripura

Points table

Fixtures

Round 1

Round 2

Round 3

Round 4

Round 5

Round 6

Round 7

References

Ranji Trophy seasons
Ranji Trophy Trophy
Ranji Trophy
Ranji Trophy